Jos Volders (born 30 December 1949, in Kwaadmechelen) is a Belgian former footballer who played as a left back.

Honours

Player 
RSC Anderlecht

 Belgian First Division: 1967–68, 1971–72, 1973–74
 Belgian Cup: 1971–72, 1972–73
 Belgian League Cup: 1973, 1974
 Inter-Cities Fairs Cup: 1969-70 (runners-up)

 Club Brugge

 Belgian First Division: 1975–76, 1976–77, 1977–78, 1979–80
 Belgian Cup: 1976–77
 UEFA Cup: 1975-76 (runner-up)
 European Cup: 1977-78 (runner-up)
 Jules Pappaert Cup: 1978

References 

1949 births
Living people
Belgian footballers
Club Brugge KV players
Association football fullbacks